The 1954 Paris–Nice was the 12th edition of the Paris–Nice cycle race and was held from 10 March to 14 March 1954. The race started in Paris and finished in Nice. The race was won by Raymond Impanis.

General classification

References

1954
1954 in road cycling
1954 in French sport
March 1954 sports events in Europe